North Oaks Golf Club (NOGC) is located in North Oaks, Minnesota, United States.  The championship golf course was originally designed by golf course architect Stanley Thompson in 1950.  The course is located just inside the private community of North Oaks. It has hosted numerous MGA Championships and a few MN section PGA Championships in 1954 and 2000.

History
In 1883 James J. Hill, known to be The Empire Builder, purchased a 3,070-acre piece of land from Charles D. Gilfillan.  This piece of land Hill named the North Oaks Farm. When Hill passed on, his son, Louis W. Hill inherited much of the land. From here the Hill heirs took over and maintained the land.  Fast forwarding to 1950, more land was bought and the planning process began.  Stanley Thompson began work on designing the course.  It officially opened in the summer 1951. Shortly before it had opened, a “hurricane” hit.  The storm caused two holes to be flooded. North Oaks Golf Club became an official private golf club in 1953. The term and process called a shotgun start, was first used at North Oaks Golf Club.  Although it was incorrectly credited three years later to a course in Washington.  Fast-forwarding even more to the year 2007, Lehman Design Group renovated the course. They fixed particular issues while mostly sticking to Thompson's original design.

References

External links
North Oaks Golf Club Home Page
Photo Gallery of Course
Virtual Tour of Golf Club and Course
PGA Home Page

1950 establishments in Minnesota
Buildings and structures in Ramsey County, Minnesota
Golf clubs and courses in Minnesota
Sports venues completed in 1950
Sports venues in Minneapolis–Saint Paul
Tourist attractions in Ramsey County, Minnesota